The 2004–05 Sunshine Tour was the fifth season of professional golf tournaments since the southern Africa based Sunshine Tour was rebranded in 2000.  The Sunshine Tour represents the highest level of competition for male professional golfers in the region.

There were 21 tournaments on the schedule. This was an increase of four from the previous year, primarily due to the addition of the Vodacom Origins of Golf Tour, a series of six regional tournaments that has been held every year since.  The other new tournament was the MTC Namibia PGA Championship.  The tour was based predominantly in South Africa, with 17 of the 21 tournaments being held in the country. Two events were held in Swaziland, and one event each was held in Botswana and Namibia.  Two events, the Dunhill Championship and the South African Airways Open were co-sanctioned by the European Tour.

As usual, the tour consisted of two distinct parts, commonly referred to as the "Summer Swing" and "Winter Swing". Tournaments held during the Summer Swing generally had much higher prize funds, attracted stronger fields, and were the only tournaments on the tour to carry world ranking points.

The Order of Merit was won by Charl Schwartzel.

Schedule 
The following table lists official events during the 2004–05 season.

Order of Merit 
The Order of Merit was based on prize money won during the season, calculated in South African rand.

Notes

References

External links 

Sunshine Tour
Sunshine Tour
Sunshine Tour